Pachyacantha is a genus of flies in the family Stratiomyidae.

Distribution
South Africa.

Species
Pachyacantha crassiventris Lindner, 1952

References

Stratiomyidae
Brachycera genera
Taxa named by Erwin Lindner
Diptera of Africa
Endemic fauna of South Africa